Azizabad (also Romanized as ‘Azīzābād and Azīzābād; also known as Madū’īyeh, Modū’īyeh, Modū’īyeh-ye ‘Azīzābād, and Mūdu) is a village in Tirjerd Rural District, in the Central District of Abarkuh County, Yazd Province, Iran. At the 2006 census, its population was 583, in 166 families.

References 

Populated places in Abarkuh County